"Handstand" is a song by Moroccan-American rapper French Montana and American rapper and singer Doja Cat featuring fellow American rapper Saweetie as the fourth single from the former's fourth studio album They Got Amnesia (2021). It was written by the performers, Darryl Clemons, Kevin Price, Jaucquez Lowe, and Hitmaka, with the latter serving as the track's producer alongside Pooh Beatz, Go Grizzly, and London Jae. A bouncy hip hop song, it interpolates Big Pun's 2000 single "It's So Hard".

"Handstand" was picked as the fourth single off They Got Amnesia on November 23, 2021, when it was promoted to the US rhythmic contemporary radio format. To further promote the song, the music video directed by Edgar Esteves and Jon Primo premiered on French Montana's YouTube channel on December 8, 2021. It features the performers in a post-apocalyptic setting fighting armed group of people. The visual received many comparitions to films. The song peaked in top 40 on the US R&B/Hip-Hop Airplay and Rhythmic charts.

Composition and reception
"Handstand" is a hip hop track that spans for two minutes and fifty seconds. It contains an interpolation of Big Pun's 2000 single "It's So Hard", which itself is based around a sample of Danny Rivera's "En Un Rincon Del Alma", thus giving Big Pun, Julian Garfield, and Younglord songwriting credit. A "bouncy" track sees the performers indulging themselves for "freaky fun", while Doja Cat raps "You need a project bitch, a hoodrat bitch / One don't give a fuck / And said she took that dick".

Uproxx writer Wongo Okon opined that "Handstand" is a "bright" moment within They Got Amnesia. Robin Murray from Clash  called the song "muscle-bound"; whereas Vivian Medithi of HipHopDX commented that the track is a "ready-made club jam for the ladies that seems destined for TikTok success", while Doja Cat "sound[s] perfectly at home".

Release and commercial performance
On November 8, 2021, French Montana shared track listing for his fourth studio album, They Got Amnesia, unveiling "Handstand" as its eight track. The album was initially scheduled to be released on November 12, but was postponed for a week, hence "Handstand" music video was not finished. Four days later, French Montana previewed a snippet of Doja Cat's verse "Handstand" on Instagram. The song ultimately was chosen as the fourth single promotiong the project. Bad Boy Records and Epic Records issued the song to the US rhythmic contemporary radio format on November 23, 2021. Next month, Sony Music sent the track to Italian radio airplay. The single peaked at number 33 on the US R&B/Hip-Hop Airplay chart becoming French Montana's 17th, and Doja Cat's sixth, top 40 entry on the chart, while on Rhythmic ranking, it was placed at number 21, being French Montana's 26th entry, Doja Cat's 12th, and Saweetie's eighth. In New Zealand, it entered Hot Singles chart at position 40.

Music video

The music video for "Handstand" was directed by Edgar Esteves and Jon Primo, and recorded on November 9, 2021. Two days later, French Montana posted a video with Doja Cat from the set of the music video. The clip premiered on the rapper's YouTube channel on December 8, 2021. It was sponsored by Russian vodka brand Beluga and mobile shopping app NTWRK.

The video is set in a post-apocalyptic world, where the rappers are fighting with armed people on the street. They use baseball bats, laser eyes, while Doja Cat is wearing machine gun bikini. During Saweetie's verse, she twerks over the burning city, whereas the cyborgs fight back against the protestors. The clip ends with French Montana showing off his non-fungible token (NFT). The visual gained comparitions to such films as The Warriors (1979), The Terminator (1984), and Barbarella (1968) by Rolling Stones Brenna Ehrlich, Waterworld (1995) by Vultures Bethy Squires, Planet Terror (2007) by Uproxx's Wongo Okon, while both Okon and Rap-Up also noted similarities to Mad Max series. Bethy Squires from Vulture wrote that "[o]ther iconic hip-hop videos have placed themselves in a Thunderdome-like future, (...) [b]ut none of these videos, stunning though they are, had the boldness of vision to imagine a world where the only connection to the civilization we once knew is sponcon."

Credits and personnel

 French Montana – lead artist, rap, songwriting
 Doja Cat – lead artist, rap, songwriting
 Saweetie – featured artist, rap, songwriting
 Big Pun – songwriting
 Julian Garfield – songwriting
 Younglord – songwriting
 Hitmaka – songwriting, production
 Darryl Clemons – songwriting
 Kevin Price – songwriting
 Jaucquez Lowe – songwriting
 Pooh Beatz – production
 Go Grizzly – production
 London Jae – production
 MIXX – engineering
 Mike Dean – mixing, mastering

Charts

Release history

References

2021 singles
2021 songs
Hip hop songs
French Montana songs
Doja Cat songs
Saweetie songs
Songs written by French Montana
Songs written by Doja Cat
Songs written by Saweetie
Songs written by Big Pun
Songs written by Hitmaka